Edmund George McCorquodale (23 July 1881 – 24 May 1904) was an English first-class cricketer.

The son of George Frederick McCorquodale and his wife, Mary Augusta Walcott Henderson, he was born at Weybridge in July 1881. He was educated at Harrow School, before going up to Trinity College, Cambridge. While studying at Cambridge, he made two appearances in first-class cricket for Cambridge University in 1901, against Worcestershire and Surrey. After injuring himself in the Surrey match, he featured in no further first-class matches for Cambridge. In addition to playing first-class cricket, he also played minor counties cricket for Hertfordshire in 1899, making two appearances in the Minor Counties Championship. He died from appendicitis in May 1904 at Tulcan Lodge in Advie, Morayshire.

References

External links

1881 births
1904 deaths
People from Weybridge
People educated at Harrow School
Alumni of Trinity College, Cambridge
English cricketers
Hertfordshire cricketers
Cambridge University cricketers
Deaths from appendicitis